James Edward Moffitt (30 June 1887 – 16 March 1964) was a New Zealand rugby union player. A lock, Moffitt represented  at a provincial level either side of World War II, and was a member of the New Zealand national side, the All Blacks, in 1920 and 1921. He played 12 matches for the All Blacks including three internationals.

During World War I, Moffitt served in the Auckland Infantry Regiment and rose to the rank of second lieutenant. He was a member of the New Zealand Division rugby team in the Somme Cup tournament in France in 1917. Following the war, he was a member of the New Zealand Army team that won the King's Cup in 1919 against other British Empire teams, and then toured South Africa.

A hotelkeeper, Moffitt died in Auckland on 16 March 1964, and was buried at Waikumete Cemetery.

References

1887 births
1964 deaths
People from Waikaia
New Zealand rugby union players
New Zealand international rugby union players
Wellington rugby union players
Rugby union locks
New Zealand Military Forces personnel of World War I
Burials at Waikumete Cemetery
New Zealand Army officers
Rugby union players from Southland, New Zealand